El Quseyya (Kos) is a city in Egypt. In ancient times it was known as Cusae or Qesy.

Populated places in Asyut Governorate